Senator Burke may refer to:

Members of the United States Senate
Edward R. Burke (1880–1968), U.S. Senator from Nebraska from 1935 to 1941
Thomas A. Burke (1898–1971), U.S. Senator from Ohio from 1953 to 1954

United States state senate members
Brian Burke (American politician) (born 1958), Wisconsin
David Burke (politician) (born 1967), Ohio State Senate
Dean Burke (born 1957), Georgia State Senate
John P. Burke (born 1954), Massachusetts State Senate
John Burke (North Dakota politician) (1859–1937), North Dakota State Senate
Michael E. Burke (1863–1918), Wisconsin State Senate
Raymond H. Burke (1881–1954), Ohio State Senate
Timothy Burke (politician) (1866–1926), Wisconsin State Senate
William J. Burke (1862–1925), Pennsylvania State Senate